The 2009–10 Florida State Seminoles men's basketball team represented Florida State University in the 2009–2010 NCAA Division I basketball season. The Seminoles were coached by Leonard Hamilton and played their home games at the Donald L. Tucker Center in Tallahassee, Florida. The Seminoles were a member of the Atlantic Coast Conference.

The Seminoles finished the season 22–10, 10–6 in ACC play. They lost in the quarterfinals of the 2010 ACC men's basketball tournament. They received and at–large bid to the 2010 NCAA Division I men's basketball tournament, earning a 9 seed in the West Region, where they lost to 8 seed Gonzaga in the first round.

Roster
Source

Schedule

|-
!colspan=9 style="background:#; color:white;"| Exhibition

|-
!colspan=9 style="background:#; color:white;"| Regular season

|-
!colspan=9 style="background:#; color:white;"| ACC tournament

|-
!colspan=9 style="background:#; color:white;"| NCAA tournament

References

External links
Almanac
Statistics

Florida State Seminoles
Florida State
Florida State Seminoles men's basketball seasons